Gian Galeazzo Visconti (16 October 1351 – 3 September 1402), was the first duke of Milan (1395) and ruled the late-medieval city just before the dawn of the Renaissance. He also ruled Lombardy jointly with his uncle Bernabò. He was the founding patron of the Certosa di Pavia, completing the Visconti Castle at Pavia begun by his father and furthering work on the Duomo of Milan. He captured a large territory of Northern Italy and the Po valley. He threatened war with France in relation to the transfer of Genoa to French control as well as issues with his beloved daughter Valentina. When he died of fever in the castello of Melegnano, his children fought with each other and fragmented the territories that he had ruled.

Biography
During his patronage of the Visconti Castle, he contributed to the growth of the collection of scientific treatises and richly illuminated manuscripts in the Visconti Library.

Gian Galeazzo was the son of Galeazzo II Visconti and Bianca of Savoy. His father possessed the signoria of the city of Pavia. In 1385 Gian Galeazzo gained control of Milan by overthrowing his uncle Bernabò through treacherous means by faking a religious conversion and ambushing him during a religious procession in Milan. He imprisoned his uncle who soon died, supposedly poisoned on his orders.

Galeazzo's role as a statesman also took other forms. Soon after seizing Milan, he took Verona, Vicenza, and Padua, establishing himself as Signore of each, and soon controlled almost the entire valley of the Po, including Piacenza where in 1393 he gave the feudal power to Confalonieri family on the lands they already had in the valleys around Piacenza. He lost Padua in 1390, when it reverted to Francesco Novello da Carrara. He received the title of Duke of Milan from Wenceslaus, King of the Romans in 1395 for 100,000 florins.

Gian Galeazzo spent 300,000 golden florins in attempting to turn from their courses the rivers Mincio from Mantua and the Brenta from Padua, in order to render those cities helpless before the force of his arms.

Notable are his library, housed in the grandest princely dwelling in Italy, the castello in Pavia, and his rich collection of manuscripts, many of them the fruits of his conquests. In 1400, Gian Galeazzo appointed a host of clerks and departments entrusted with improving public health. For the new system of administration and bookkeeping this established, he is credited with creating the first modern bureaucracy, with the assistance of his Chancellor Francesco Barbavara.

Conflict with France 
Galeazzo was a devoted father to his daughter Valentina. He reacted to gossip about Valentina at the French Court by threatening to declare war on France. The wife of King Charles VI of France was Isabeau of Bavaria, the granddaughter of Bernabò Visconti, and, thus, a bitter rival of Valentina and her father Gian Galeazzo.

Furious at French political manoeuvring that had removed Genoa from his influence, Gian Galeazzo had been attempting to stop the transfer of Genoese sovereignty to France and Enguerrand VII was dispatched to warn him that France would consider further interference a hostile act. The quarrel was more than political. Valentina Visconti, the wife of the Duke of Orleans and Gian Galeazzo's beloved daughter, had been exiled from Paris due to the machinations of Queen Isabeau the same month as the departure of the crusade.

In 1396, after the disaster of Nicopolis, Galeazzo was strongly suspected of having informed the Ottomans of the crusaders' plans and of the size and strength of their army as vengeance for his daughter being accused of being behind the illness of King Charles VI of France, and for France's increasing control over the city of Genoa that he had attempted to hamper, for which he had been rebuked by Enguerrand VII before the battle.

Uniting Italy and death 
Gian Galeazzo had dreams of uniting all of northern Italy into one kingdom, a revived Lombard empire. Obstacles included Bologna and especially Florence. In 1402, Gian Galeazzo launched assaults upon these cities. The warfare was extremely costly on both sides, but it was universally believed the Milanese would emerge victorious. The Florentine leaders, especially the chancellor Coluccio Salutati worked successfully to rally the people of Florence, but the Florentines were being taxed hard by famine, disease, and poverty. Galeazzo won another victory over the Bolognese at the Battle of Casalecchio on 26-27 June 1402.

Galeazzo's dreams were to come to naught, however, as he succumbed to a fever at the Castello of Melegnano on 10 August 1402. He died on 3 September. His empire fragmented as infighting among his successors wrecked Milan, partly through his division of his lands among both legitimate and illegitimate children.

Marriage and issue 
His first marriage was to Isabelle of Valois, who brought him the title of comte de Vertus in Champagne, rendered in Italian as Conte di Virtù, the title by which he was known in his early career. They had:
Gian Galeazzo (b. Pavia, 4 March 1366 – d. bef. 1376).
Azzone (b. Pavia, 1368 – d. Pavia, 4 October 1381).
Valentina (b. Pavia, 1371 – d. Château de Blois, Loir-et-Cher, 14 December 1408), married on 17 August 1389 to Louis I, Duke of Orléans
Carlo (b. Pavia, 11 September 1372 – d. Pavia, 1374).

After Galeazzo's wife Isabelle died in childbirth in 1372, he married secondly, on 2 October 1380, his niece Caterina Visconti, daughter of Bernabò; with her he had:
Gian Maria (7 September 1388 – 16 May 1412)
Filippo Maria (3 September 1392 – 13 August 1447).

Gallery

See also 
 Montechino Italian Castle Piacenza

Notes

References

Sources

External links 
 Portrait and family tree 

Gian Galeazzo Visconti
Gian Galeazzo Visconti
People from Pavia
14th-century Italian nobility
1351 births
1402 deaths